The Grammy Award for Best Country Song (sometimes known as the Country Songwriter's Award) has been awarded since 1965.  The award is given to the songwriter(s) of the song, not to the artist, except if the artist is also the songwriter.

There have been several minor changes to the name of the award:

From 1965 to 1968, it was known as "Best Country & Western Song"
From 1969 to 1983, it was awarded as "Best Country Song"
In 1984, it was awarded as "Best New Country Song "
From 1985 to the present, it has again been awarded as "Best Country Song"

Years reflect the year in which the Grammy Awards were presented, for music released in the previous year. Lori McKenna and Josh Kear hold the record of most wins in the category with three wins each.

Recipients

Songwriters with multiple wins
3 wins
Lori McKenna
Josh Kear

2 wins
Brandi Carlile
Vince Gill
John Barlow Jarvis
Robert John "Mutt" Lange
Hillary Lindsey
Shane McAnally
Roger Miller
Kacey Musgraves
Paul Overstreet
Liz Rose
Don Schlitz
Billy Sherrill
Chris Stapleton
Taylor Swift
Chris Tompkins
Shania Twain

Songwriters with multiple nominations
8 nominations
Vince Gill
Shane McAnally

6 nominations
Miranda Lambert
Lori McKenna

5 nominations
Hillary Lindsey
Maren Morris
Billy Sherrill
Taylor Swift

4 nominations
Bill Anderson
Mary Chapin Carpenter
Rodney Crowell
Tom Douglas
Ashley Gorley
Kris Kristofferson
Robert John "Mutt" Lange
Kacey Musgraves
Josh Osborne
Don Schlitz
Chris Stapleton
Shania Twain

3 nominations
Casey Beathard
Matraca Berg
Eric Church
Jessie Jo Dillon
Natalie Hemby
Alan Jackson
Jamey Johnson
Josh Kear (has won every nomination)
Luke Laird
Lee Thomas Miller
Roger Miller
K. T. Oslin
Thomas Rhett
Liz Rose
Laura Veltz

2 nominations
Gary Baker
Brandi Carlile (has won every nomination)
Robert Lee Castleman
Larry Gatlin
Dave Haywood
Marcus Hummon
John Barlow Jarvis (has won every nomination)
Charles Kelley
Richard Leigh
Chips Moman
Bob Morrison
Kenny O'Dell
Paul Overstreet (has won every nomination)
Dolly Parton
Ben Peters
Mike Reid
Marty Robbins
Bobby Russell
Hillary Scott
Chris Tompkins (has won every nomination)
Norro Wilson

Songwriters with multiple nominations and no wins
6 nominations
Miranda Lambert

5 nominations
Maren Morris

4 nominations
Bill Anderson
Mary Chapin Carpenter
Tom Douglas
Ashley Gorley

3 nominations
Casey Beathard
Matraca Berg
Eric Church
Jessie Jo Dillon
Jamey Johnson
Lee Thomas Miller
Thomas Rhett
Laura Veltz

2 nominations
Jessi Alexander
Brett Beavers
Dierks Bentley
Steve Bogard
Kenny Chesney
Brandy Clark
Jill Collins
Monty Criswell
Zach Crowell
Dean Dillon
Nicolle Galyon
Pat Green
Tom T. Hall
Connie Harrington
Jeff Hyde
Loretta Lynn
Chase McGill
Jamie O'Neal
Brad Paisley
Jordan Reynolds
John Rich
Allen Shamblin
Dan Smyers
Jeffrey Steele
Steve Wariner
Dottie West
Gretchen Wilson

Artists with multiple nominations and wins
9 nominations
Vince Gill 2 wins

8 nominations
Miranda Lambert
Willie Nelson 3 wins

7 nominations
Alan Jackson 2 wins				
Tim McGraw 2 wins

6 nominations
Faith Hill
Charley Pride 1 win

5 nominations
Mary Chapin Carpenter 1 win	
Maren Morris

4 nominations
Roger Miller 3 wins
Ronnie Milsap 1 win
Charlie Rich 2 wins
Kenny Rogers 2 wins
Chris Stapleton 2 wins
George Strait
Taylor Swift 2 wins
Shania Twain 2 wins
Gretchen Wilson
Lee Ann Womack 1 win

3 nominations
Trace Adkins
Garth Brooks
Glen Campbell 2 wins
The Chicks (formally Dixie Chicks)
Eric Church
Lee Greenwood
Waylon Jennings
Little Big Town 1 win
Loretta Lynn
Reba McEntire
Kacey Musgraves 2 wins
K. T. Oslin 1 win
Dolly Parton 1 win
Blake Shelton
Carrie Underwood 3 wins
Dottie West
Dwight Yoakam

2 nominations
Alabama
Bobby Bare
Dierks Bentley
Deanna Carter
Rodney Crowell 1 win
Dan + Shay
David Frizzell
Larry Gartlin 1 win
Pat Green
Merle Haggard
Emmylou Harris
The Highwaymen 1 win
Jamey Johnson
George Jones
The Judds 2 wins
Alison Krauss & Union Station 1 win
Lady A (formally Lady Antebellum) 1 win
Lonestar
Patty Loveless
John Michael Montgomery 1 win
Jamie O'Neal
Brad Paisley
Eddie Rabbitt
Rascal Flatts 1 win
Thomas Rhett
Marty Robbins 1 win
Randy Travis 1 win
Tanya Tucker 1 win
Steve Wariner
Hank Williams, Jr.
Tammy Wynette
Trisha Yearwood

References

Grammy Awards for country music
Country Song
Song awards
Songwriting awards